Manduca dilucida is a moth of the family Sphingidae first described by William Henry Edwards in 1887.

Distribution 
It is found from Mexico to Belize, Nicaragua and Costa Rica and possibly across northern South America to Venezuela.

Description 
The wingspan is 95–98 mm.

Biology 

Adults have been recorded in February and from April to October in Costa Rica. There are probably three generations per year.

The larvae feed on Annona reticulata, Annona holosericea, Sapranthus palanga, Amphilophilum paniculatum, Crescentia alata, Tabebuia ochracea, Cordia alliodora and Cornutia grandifolia. There are several colour morphs and five instars. The first instar is pale green with a black horn.

References

Manduca
Moths described in 1887